Tan Jiazhen (15 September 1909 – 1 November 2008), also known as C. C. Tan, was a Chinese geneticist. He was an academician of the Chinese Academy of Sciences and a foreign member of United States National Academy of Sciences. Tan was a main founder of modern Chinese genetics.

Biography
Tan was born in Cixi, Ningbo, Zhejiang. His father was a local postman. From 1926 to 1930, Tan did his undergraduate study at Soochow University. In 1932, Tan received M.Sc from Yenching University. Tan continued his study in the United States and received PhD from the California Institute of Technology in 1937, under the supervision of Theodosius Dobzhansky. Thomas Hunt Morgan and Alfred Henry Sturtevant also were his professors. He later taught at Columbia University.

After Tan returned to China, he became a professor at the Department of Biology of Zhejiang University in Hangzhou. In 1952, Tan was transferred to Fudan University in Shanghai. Tan founded the first department of genetics in China at Fudan University.

"As part of the Morgan group in the 1930s, Tan helped make Drosophila pseudoobscura the leading species for evolutionary studies and did pioneering work in insect genetics. In spite of interruptions by Lysenkoism and by the Cultural Revolution, Tan was still scientifically active in China."

Tan died on 1 November 2008 of multiple organ dysfunction syndrome at the age of 99 in Shanghai.

Main academic positions
 At Fudan University:
 Founding Chair of the Department of Genetics, Fudan University
 Director of the Research Institute of Genetics, Fudan University
 Head of the School of Life Sciences, Fudan University
 Vice-president of Fudan University
 Vice-president, President, Honorary-president of the Chinese Society for Genetics
 Editor-in-chief, Acta Genetica Sinica
 President, Chinese Society for Biotechnology
 Board Director, Chinese Environmental Mutagen Society
 Member of the Board, The 8th International Congress of Genetics, 1948, Sweden
 Vice-president, 15th International Congress of Genetics, 1983, India
 Vice-president, 16th International Congress of Genetics, 1988, Canada
 Vice-president, 17th International Congress of Genetics, 1993, UK
 President, 18th International Congress of Genetics, 1998, Beijing China

Political positions

 Honorary president, China Democratic League

Honors and awards
 Academician, Chinese Academy of Sciences, elected 1980
 Member, The Third World Academy of Sciences, elected 1985
 Foreign member, United States National Academy of Sciences, elected 1985
 Foreign member, Italian Accademia dei Quaranta, elected 1987
 Honorary member, The New York Academy of Sciences, elected 1999
 Caltech Distinguished Alumni Award
 Honorary Citizenship, California, United States
 Honorary doctorate from the York University, Canada, 1984
 Honorary doctorate from the University of Maryland, College Park, USA, 1985
 Asteroid 3542 Tanjiazhen is named after him

References

External links
A review by Professor James Crow of the life and work of C C Tan
Career at Fudan University

1909 births
2008 deaths
Biologists from Zhejiang
California Institute of Technology alumni
Columbia University faculty
Chinese geneticists
Deaths from multiple organ failure
Foreign associates of the National Academy of Sciences
Academic staff of Fudan University
Members of the Chinese Academy of Sciences
People from Cixi
Scientists from Ningbo
Soochow University (Suzhou) alumni
Yenching University alumni
Academic staff of Zhejiang University